Dean Alberto Villarruz College, DAV College (formerly: STI College-Roxas (VILL-NET INC.), was a technical school located in Lawaan, Roxas City (formerly located in Quintia Bldg., Magallanes St., Roxas City, Capiz, Philippines). It was a member of CAPTESA together with Filamer Christian University, Colegio dela Purisima Concepcion, Capiz State University, Hercor College, Lifegoal, Lifeline, Master’s Hand, TechnoGlobe, PACE Computer College, St. Anthony College-Roxas, Dumalag Vocational and Technical School (DVTS), Capiz Institute of Electronics and AMA-CLC.

Authorized Courses
Certificate in Information System 
Cyber Programming
Diploma in Computer and Electronics Technology
Diploma in Information Technology
Diploma in Office Skills and Management
PC Troubleshooting
Two-Year Associate in Computer Science

Trivia
Most of the time, it is misspelled with a "single r" as Dean Alberto Villaruz College.

References

Education in Roxas, Capiz
Universities and colleges in Capiz